Nepenthes × trichocarpa (from Greek: trikho- "hair, thread", and -carpus "fruit"), the dainty pitcher-Plant, is a common natural hybrid involving N. ampullaria and N. gracilis. It was originally thought to be a distinct species and was described as such.

B. H. Danser included this plant in his 1928 monograph on the genus Nepenthes.  He described the plant as a climbing stem cylindrical in cross-section, and  pitchers of the rosettes shortly incurved from the tendril and ovate in form.  Both lower and upper pitchers can be up to 8 cm tall, widest at 1/3 of the height, up to 4 cm wide, with two fringed wings over the whole length.

The colour of the pitchers ranges from green to spotted or striped with red or yellow, forming wonderful carpets on the forest floor and dainty upper pitchers scrambling up supporting shrubs and trees.

Nepenthes × trichocarpa is found throughout the lowlands of Peninsular Malaysia, Borneo, Singapore and Sumatra, usually in the company of its parent species, N. ampullaria and N. gracilis. It has also been recorded from southern Thailand and from smaller surrounding islands such as Natuna.

Infraspecific taxa
Nepenthes trichocarpa var. erythrosticta Miq. (1861)

References

Further reading

 Clarke, C.M. 2006. Introduction. In: Danser, B.H. The Nepenthaceae of the Netherlands Indies. Natural History Publications (Borneo), Kota Kinabalu. pp. 1–15.
  Enjelina, W. 2012. Analisis hibrid alam kantung semar (Nepenthes) di Bukit Taratak Kabupaten Pesisir Selatan Sumatera Barat dengan teknik RAPD. M.Sc. thesis, Andalas University, Padang. 
 Hwee, K.C. 1996. Carnivorous plants and sites in Singapore. Bulletin of the Australian Carnivorous Plant Society, Inc. 15(4): 12–15.
  Mansur, M. 2001.  In: Prosiding Seminar Hari Cinta Puspa dan Satwa Nasional. Lembaga Ilmu Pengetahuan Indonesia, Bogor. pp. 244–253.
  Mansur, M. 2007. Keanekaragaman jenis Nepenthes (kantong semar) dataran rendah di Kalimantan Tengah. [Diversity of lowland Nepenthes (kantong semar) in Central Kalimantan.] Berita Biologi 8(5): 335–341. Abstract
 Shivas, R.G. 1983. Nepenthes trichocarpa — a natural hybrid. Nature Malaysiana 8(2): 24–25.
 Shivas, R.G. 1984. Pitcher Plants of Peninsular Malaysia & Singapore. Maruzen Asia, Kuala Lumpur.
  Srirahayu 2010. Kajian fertilitas hibrid alami pada populasi Nepenthes di Bukit Taratak, Kenagarian Surantih, Kecamatan Sutera, Kabupaten Pesisir Selatan. Thesis, Andalas University, Padang. Abstract 
 Teo, L.L. 2001. Study of natural hybridisation in some tropical plants using amplified fragment length polymorphism analysis. M.Sc. thesis, Nanyang Technological University, Singapore.

Carnivorous plants of Asia
trichocarpa
Flora of Borneo
Flora of Malaya
Flora of Sumatra
Flora of Thailand